Ato Ahwoi  is a Ghanaian politician,  who served as board chairman of the Ghana National Petroleum Corporation from 2009 to 2013 in the National Democratic Congress (NDC) government, during the reign of John Atta Mills and as Minister of Energy from 1987 to 1993 during the reign of Jerry Rawlings within the PNDC era.

Personal life 
He has eight siblings. He has two brothers, Kwamena Ahwoi and Kwesi Ahwoi, who both served along with him in the Rawlings government.

References 

Living people
National Democratic Congress (Ghana) politicians
Government ministers of Ghana
Year of birth missing (living people)
Prempeh College alumni